Piotr Brożyna (born 17 February 1995) is a Polish professional racing cyclist, who currently rides for UCI Continental team .

Major results
2014
 1st  Road race, National Under-23 Road Championships
2016
 3rd Road race, National Under-23 Road Championships
2017
 3rd Overall Okolo Slovenska
1st  Young rider classification
 8th Memorial Grundmanna I Wizowskiego
 10th Overall Szlakiem Walk Majora Hubala
1st  Young rider classification
2018
 7th GP Slovakia, Visegrad 4 Bicycle Race
2019
 6th Overall Tour of Romania
 6th Overall CCC Tour - Grody Piastowskie
 9th Overall Czech Cycling Tour
 10th Overall Bałtyk–Karkonosze Tour
2021
 5th Overall Szlakiem Grodów Piastowskich
 7th Overall Tour of Mevlana
 7th Overall Alpes Isère Tour
 10th Overall Tour of Małopolska
2022
 7th GP Vipava Valley & Crossborder Goriška
 8th GP Adria Mobil

References

External links
 

1995 births
Living people
Polish male cyclists
Sportspeople from Zakopane